Little Feet is a 2013 American drama film written and directed by Alexandre Rockwell. It was screened in the Contemporary World Cinema section at the 2013 Toronto International Film Festival.

Cast
 Rene Cuante-Bautista
 Lana Rockwell
 Nico Rockwell

References

External links
 

2013 films
2013 drama films
American drama films
Films directed by Alexandre Rockwell
2010s English-language films
2010s American films